Do What You Want is the third EP by American rock band OK Go to promote their second album Oh No. It includes two songs ("Do What You Want" and "Invincible") that would later be released on the album and a third song, a cover of The Cure's "The Lovecats" which would also be later released as a b-side to the "A Million Ways" and the "Here It Goes Again" singles.

Track listing
 "Do What You Want" (Tim Nordwind, Damian Kulash) – 3:05
 "Invincible" (Damian Kulash) – 3:31
 "The Lovecats" (Robert Smith) – 3:31

2005 EPs
OK Go EPs
Capitol Records EPs